Ruth 4 is the fourth (and the last) chapter of the Book of Ruth in the Hebrew Bible or the Old Testament of the Christian Bible,  part of the Ketuvim ("Writings"). This chapter contains the story of how Boaz goes up to the city gate, calls his kinsman; inquires whether he would redeem and marry Ruth, Ruth 4:1-5. He refuses, Ruth 4:6-8. Boaz, with the people witnessing and congratulating, buys the inheritance, and marries Ruth, Ruth 4:9-12. She gave birth to Obed the grandfather of King David, Ruth 4:13-17. The genealogy from Perez (Pharez) to David, Ruth 4:18-22.

Text
The original text was written in Hebrew language. This chapter is divided into 22 verses.

Textual versions
Some early witnesses for the text of this chapter in Hebrew are of the Masoretic Text, which includes the Aleppo Codex (10th century) and Codex Leningradensis (1008). Some fragments containing parts of this chapter were found among the Dead Sea Scrolls, i.e., 2Q16 (2QRutha; ~50 CE) with extant verses 3‑4, with only slight variations from the Masoretic Text.

There is also a translation into Koine Greek known as the Septuagint, made in the last few centuries BC. Extant ancient manuscripts of the Septuagint version include Codex Vaticanus (B; B; 4th century), and Codex Alexandrinus (A; A; 5th century).

The Bethlehem Trilogy
Three sections of the Hebrew Bible (Old Testament) — Judges 17–18, Judges 19–21, Ruth 1–4 — form a trilogy with a link to the city Bethlehem of Judah and characterized by the repetitive unique statement:
"In those days there was no king in Israel; everyone did what was right in his own eyes"
(Judges 17:6; 18:1; 19:1; 21:25; cf. Ruth 1:1)
as in the following chart:

Verse 1

 Then went Boaz up to the gate, and sat him down there:
 and, behold, the kinsman of whom Boaz spake came by; unto whom he said,
 Ho, such a one! turn aside, sit down here.
 And he turned aside, and sat down.
 "The gate": The city gate is a common place of concourse, business, and justice in the Middle East at that time (see ;). In the middle of the day, as Josephus wrote, where people were continually passing and repassing the gate of the city, to and from the country, and where Boaz most likely could meet with the person he wanted to talk to, also where courts of judicature were usually held, to properly judge the case he had, thus the Targum states, "and Boaz went up to the gate of the house of judgment of the sanhedrim." 
 "Ho, such a one!" (or "so and so"; Hebrew: פלני אלמני peloni almoni): The Hebrew words "peloni almoni" are used to denote persons and places, whose names they either could not, or did not choose to mention. Its use here may indicate that the name of the kinsman was either unknown or purposely concealed ; . The name of this man was "Tob" or "Tobias", according to some Jewish writers; see notes on Ruth 3:13. The phrase "such a one," or "so and so," is a purely idiomatic English equivalent for the purely idiomatic Hebrew phrase peloni almoni. A literal translation is impossible. The Latin N.N. corresponds to this term.

Verse 2
 And he took ten men of the elders of the city, and said, "Sit down here." So they sat down.
 "He took ten men of the elders of the city": as witnesses. In ordinary circumstances, two or three were sufficient to attest a bargain; but in cases of importance, such as matrimony, divorce, conveyancing of property, it was the Jewish practice to have ten. Every city was governed by elders. For the number "ten," compare . Probably the presence of, at least, ten elders was necessary to make a lawful public assembly, as among modern Jews ten (a minyon) are necessary to constitute a synagogue. The Jews gather, that the blessing of the bride and bridegroom at their marriage is not to be done by less than ten persons.

Verse 3
 And he said unto the kinsman,
 Naomi, that is come again out of the country of Moab,
 selleth a parcel of land, which was our brother Elimelech's
 "Naomi": Both Naomi and Ruth had an interest in the land during their lives; but Naomi alone was mentioned, not only because she directed all the negotiations, but because the introduction of Ruth's name would awaken a suspicion of the necessity of marrying her, before the first proposition was answered.
 "Sell": Boaz, speaking of Naomi's determination to sell her land, says מָכְרָה נָךעמִי, literally, "has sold" ("has resolved to sell"). The English idiom would be "is selling". In King James's English version the verb is thus freely rendered "selleth." Luther's version is equivalent - beut feil, "offers for sale;" or, as Coverdale renders it, "offereth to sell." Vatable freely renders it as we have done, "has determined to sell" (vendere decrepit) so Drusius (vendere instituit). In her circumstances Naomi was at liberty to part with it. 
 "Our brother Elimelech": The kind family feeling of Boaz, shining out of this expression is noteworthy. "Brother" was to him a homely and gracious term for "near kinsman" (see ; ; ;).

Verse 7

Now this was the custom in former times in Israel concerning redeeming and exchanging, to confirm anything: one man took off his sandal and gave it to the other, and this was a confirmation in Israel.
Josephus writes that this narrative refers to that law, not only concerning purchase of estates, but also "concerning exchanging" one field for another, as Aben Ezra interprets it: "for to confirm all things"; the following custom was observed for the confirmation of any bargain whatever, whether by sale or barter, and where there was no marriage in the case."
 "In former times in Israel": indicating that the custom was obsolete in the time the book was written. The letter of the law was not strictly followed as it was thought sufficient for the man to pull off his own shoe and give it to the man to whom he ceded his right, in the presence of the elders of his city.

Verse 10

"Moreover, Ruth the Moabitess, the widow of Mahlon, I have acquired as my wife, to perpetuate the name of the dead through his inheritance, that the name of the dead may not be cut off from among his brethren and from his position at the gate. You are witnesses this day."

Verse 11
And all the people who were at the gate, and the elders, said, "We are witnesses. The Lord make the woman who is coming to your house like Rachel and Leah, the two who built the house of Israel; and may you prosper in Ephrathah and be famous in Bethlehem."
 "And all the people who were at the gate, and the elders": A multitude were present on the occasion, perhaps from curiosity or interest. Even without a signing of deeds, the transfer was completely executed by the public manner.
 "Like Rachel and Leah, the two who built the house of Israel": Rachel and Leah are the two wives of Jacob. The Targum adds, "with twelve tribes"; for although some of the tribes sprung from their maids, which they gave to Jacob, yet the children born of them were reckoned theirs by a "moral estimation". Rachel is named before Leah, although she was the youngest, and had the fewest children, because she was Jacob's first wife in his intention, and according to the covenant made with her father, despite the deceit of giving Leah first, so Rachel was his more lawful wife, and his most beloved one. By the children of these two, and their maidens, the house or family of Israel was built up, to become a great nation, consisting of twelve tribes, with very numerous people.
 "May you prosper in Ephrathah" (KJV: "do thou worthily in Ephratah"): or "Do thou manfully in Ephratah". Jerome seems to have had a slightly different reading, since he applies both clauses to Ruth (the word khayil is used in Proverbs 31:10 as "virtuous" in the phrase “virtuous woman"; אשת חיל eshet khayil): "May she be a pattern of virtue in Ephratah, and have a name famous in Bethlehem." The meaning of "be famous" seems to be, "Get yourself a name which shall be celebrated in Bethlehem, as the head of a powerful and illustrious house": literally it is, "proclaim a name," i. e. cause others to proclaim your name, as in Ruth 4:14.

Verse 12
 "May your house be like the house of Perez, whom Tamar bore to Judah, because of the offspring which the Lord will give you from this young woman."
 "Of the offspring (KJV: "seed") which the Lord will give you from this young woman": it is plain that Ruth was present there, as the speakers point to her, considered a young woman, though a widow. The elders wish and pray Boaz might have a numerous family of the children and this might be the rather expected of her, as being a young woman, although children are only as the gift of God.

Verse 14
 Then the women said to Naomi, "Blessed be the Lord, who has not left you this day without a close relative; and may his name be famous in Israel!"
 "May his name be famous in Israel": this may refer to the "name of God", or to Boaz, who shows charity, integrity, and humility, in redeeming the estate, and taking Ruth to be his wife, but also to the newborn child, whom the people wish to be very famous and honorable in Israel, and in reality becoming the progenitor of illustrious persons as Jesse, David, etc. and even Jesus Christ, the Messiah.

Verse 15
 "And may he be to you a restorer of life and a nourisher of your old age; for your daughter-in-law, who loves you, who is better to you than seven sons, has borne him."
 "Is better to you than seven sons": The number "7" suggested an "idea of fullness, completeness, perfection". The whole inhabitants of the city aware of Ruth's love to her mother-in-law which was indeed transcendent, and also that it had "transcendently" been returned.

Verse 16
 
 And Naomi took the child,
 and laid it in her bosom,
 and became nurse unto it.
 "And became a nurse unto it": that is, after the mother had suckled and weaned it, then she took it from her, and brought it up.

Verse 17
 Also the neighbor women gave him a name, saying, "There is a son born to Naomi." And they called his name Obed. He is the father of Jesse, the father of David.
 "Also (= 'and') the neighbor women gave him a name": Josephus writes that Naomi gave it, by the advice of her neighbors, probably on the eighth day when the boy was circumcised, while the neighbors were invited on that occasion, and it was usual to give names to children on that day (cf. ).
 "And they called his name Obed": meaning "serving", as Josephus observes this name was given, not for the service of his mother to Naomi before her marriage with Boaz, but rather for the service that he would be for Naomi, although the reason of it, is interpreted in Targum as, "who served the Lord of the world with a perfect heart;" and so to be a servant of the Lord.
 "He is the father of Jesse, and the father of David": Jesse is called the "Bethlehemite" (1 Samuel 16:1), living in the city of Bethlehem, which is also the city of Boaz was when his son Obed was born, who would later be the father of Jesse, of whom was born David king of Israel, and from whom came the Messiah, as noted in his genealogy according to the Evangelists Matthew (Matthew 1); and Luke (Luke 3).

Genealogy
Verses 18–22 contains a genealogy Perez (son of Judah) to David with names which, on literary grounds, "form a counterpart to the tragic names" in Ruth chapter 1.

See also

Related Bible parts: Deuteronomy 25, Ruth 2, Ruth 3, Proverbs 31, Matthew 1, Luke 3

Notes

References

Bibliography

External links

Jewish
Ruth 4 Hebrew with Parallel English
Ruth 4 Hebrew with Rashi's Commentary

Christian
Ruth 4 English Translation with Parallel Latin Vulgate

04